Jess Salgueiro is a Canadian actress, known for her roles in The Boys, Workin' Moms, The Expanse, Letterkenny and Orphan Black. Salgueiro is set to appear in a starring role in the Netflix show Tiny Pretty Things, based on the book of the same name.

As well as having a recurring role in season four of The Expanse, she also appeared in the Netflix comic book adaptation of Jupiter's Legacy, based on the comic book by Mark Millar and Frank Quitely.

Salgueiro was selected as a "rising star" at the 2018 Toronto International Film Festival for her role in Mouthpiece.

She starred in the 2019 comedy film Canadian Strain.

In 2023, she was cast in the upcoming Paramount+ revival of the classic sitcom Frasier.

Personal life 
Salgueiro was born in Winnipeg, Manitoba and attended Randolph Academy for the Performing Arts in Toronto, Ontario. Her parents are Portuguese Canadians; her father and mother emigrated from Alcanena and Santa Bárbara de Nexe, respectively. She resides in Toronto.

Filmography

Video game roles
 Far Cry 6 (2021)

References

External links

Living people
Actresses from Winnipeg
Canadian television actresses
Canadian film actresses
Randolph College for the Performing Arts alumni
Canadian people of Portuguese descent
21st-century Canadian actresses
Year of birth missing (living people)